Jon Klassen  (born November 29, 1981) is a Canadian writer and illustrator of children's books and an animator. He won both the American Caldecott Medal and the British Kate Greenaway Medal for children's book illustration, recognizing the 2012 picture book This Is Not My Hat, which he also wrote. He is the first person to win both awards for the same work.

This Is Not My Hat is a companion to Klassen's preceding picture book, I Want My Hat Back (2011), which was his first as both writer and illustrator. Both books were on the New York Times Best Seller list for more than 40 weeks; by April 2014 one or the other had been translated into 22 languages and they had jointly surpassed one million worldwide sales. Both books were recommended for children ages 5+ by the Greenaway judges. Klassen's "hat" trilogy was completed with the publication of We Found a Hat (2016).

Early life and education
Klassen was born in Winnipeg, Manitoba, Canada, in 1981 and grew up in Niagara Falls and Toronto, Ontario. He studied animation at Sheridan College, graduated in 2005, and moved to Los Angeles.

Career
In 2005, he made an animated short with Daniel Rodrigues, An Eye for Annai. He worked on animation of the feature films Kung Fu Panda (2008) and Coraline (2009) and he was art director for the 2009 animated music video of "I'll Go Crazy If I Don't Go Crazy Tonight" by U2.

In 2010, Klassen achieved international recognition when he was awarded the Governor General's Award for English-language children's illustration for his work on the picture book Cats' Night Out, written by Carolyn Stutson. He also illustrated The Mysterious Howling by Maryrose Wood, the first novel in a HarperCollins series called The Incorrigible Children of Ashton Place along with the second and third, and the first edition hardcover of the fourth novel in the series.

His first solo picture book was I Want My Hat Back, published by Candlewick Press in September 2011. It features a bear looking for his hat, who finally finds it and then off-page eats the rabbit who stole it. The New York Times Book Review named it one of the "10 Best Illustrated Children's Books for 2011". The book was published in September by Candlewick Press. Klassen said of the ending, which has been called a "subversive risk", that "there was no other way for it to end". It achieved considerable commercial success, and even became an internet meme when people started "posting their own versions of the story". Pamela Paul praised the book in review for The New York Times: "it is a wonderful and astonishing thing, the kind of book that makes child laugh and adult chuckle, and both smile in appreciation ... [it is] a charmingly wicked little book and the debut of a promising writer-illustrator talent." According to the Chicago Tribune, "the joy of this book lies in figuring out the explicit plot from the implicit details in the pictures." There has been some discussion of the ending, however: is it appropriate in a children's book that one character kills another without repercussion? A bookseller, who "need[ed] to go on record as saying I LOVE this book", reported that some customers love it until they turn the last pages. It was a runner-up for the American Geisel Award (books for beginning readers) and made the Greenaway shortlist.

Klassen modified the story in a companion book one year later, This Is Not My Hat (Candlewick, 2012). It features a little fish who steals and wears the hat of a big fish, whom the little one evades until the last pages. Finally the big fish swims back into the book, wearing the hat, with no sign of the thief. This one won the Caldecott and Greenaway Medals, from the American and British professional librarians respectively. According to the award committee, "With minute changes in eyes and the slightest displacement of seagrass, Klassen's masterful illustrations tell the story the narrator doesn't know." Klassen was also awarded with a Caldecott Honor that same year for Extra Yarn, only the second time that has happened. The Greenaway recognizes "distinguished illustration in a book for children", not necessarily a picture book. According to the British judges, "The format and layout work perfectly to convey the underwater location with the movement of the action flowing with the water from left to right. ... The juxtaposition of text and image works with perfect comic timing. Amazing expression is conveyed by the eyes and dramatic tension by little bubbles." The Greenaway is paired in a London announcement and presentation ceremony with the Carnegie Medal for children's literature, which recognized a controversially grim young-adult novel in 2014. According to the press release, "both winners independently argued that children benefit from stories without happy endings." Klassen said in his acceptance speech, "Making a book, you're kind of going out on a limb in the belief that what you think of as a satisfying story is the same as what other people think of as a satisfying story. This doesn't mean everything in the story turns out alright for everybody, but you, as a storyteller, try and make sure it ends the way the story should end."

Klassen illustrated The Dark (2013), written by Lemony Snicket, which made the Greenaway Medal shortlist of eight books alongside This Is Not My Hat.He teamed up with Mac Barnett again in 2014, on a picture book published by Candlewick, Sam and Dave Dig a Hole.

In 2019, I Want My Hat Back, This Is Not My Hat, and We Found a Hat were released in a boxed set by Candlewick Press as Jon Klassen's Hat Box.

Publications

As author and illustrator
 The Hat Trilogy
 I Want My Hat Back (Candlewick, Sep 2011), 
 This Is Not My Hat (Candlewick, Oct 2012), 
 We Found a Hat (Candlewick, Oct 2016), 
 The Rock from the Sky (Candlewick, Apr 2021), 

As illustrator
With Mac Barnett
 The Shape Trilogy
 Triangle (Candlewick, Mar 2017), 
 Square (Candlewick, May 2018), 
 Circle (Candlewick, Mar 2019), 
 Extra Yarn (Balzer + Bray, a HarperCollins imprint, Jan 2012), 
 Sam and Dave Dig a Hole (Candlewick, Oct 2014), 
 The Wolf, the Duck, and the Mouse (Candlewick, Oct 2017), 
 The Three Billy Goats Gruff (Orchard Books, Oct 2022), 

Children's picture books illustrated
 Cats' Night Out, by Carolyn Stutson (Simon & Schuster, Mar 2010), 
 House Held Up By Trees, by Ted Kooser (Candlewick, Mar 2012), 
 The Dark, by Lemony Snicket (Little, Brown, Apr 2013), 

Other books illustrated
 The Incorrigible Children of Ashton Place – series of novels by Maryrose Wood (published by Balzer + Bray)
 Book I: The Mysterious Howling (Feb 2010), 
 Book II: The Hidden Gallery (Feb 2011), 
 Book III: The Unseen Guest (Mar 2012), 
 Book IV: The Interrupted Tale (Dec 2013), 
 (Book V: The Unmapped Sea (Apr 2015), was illustrated by Eliza Wheeler)
 Vanished, by Sheela Chari (Hyperion, July 2011), 
 The Watch that Ends the Night: Voices from the Titanic, by Allan Wolf (Candlewick, Mar 2013), 
 The Witch's Boy, by Kelly Barnhill (Algonquin, Sep 2014), 
 The Nest, by Kenneth Oppel (Simon & Schuster, Oct 2015), 
 Pax, by Sara Pennypacker (Balzer + Bray, Feb 2016), 
 Skunk and Badger, by Amy Timberlake (Algonquin, Sep 2020), 
 Pax, Journey Home, by Sara Pennypacker (Balzer + Bray, Sep 2021), 
 Egg Marks The Spot, by Amy Timberlake (Algonquin, Sep 2021),

Awards 
 2012 Honor, Irma Black Award
 2013 Honor, Irma Black Award
 2013 Honor, Caldecott Medal
 2013 Winner, Caldecott Medal
 2013 Winner, Deutscher Jugendliteraturpreis for Best Picture Book
 2015 Winner, Irma Black Award
 2015 Honor, Caldecott Medal

Notes

References

External links

 Klassen at publisher Candlewick Press (Walker Books subsidiary)
 "I Want My Hat Back Book Trailer" – animation (video, YouTube, 5 July 2011)
 "An Eye for Annai" – animation (video, YouTube, 19 December 2005)
  (mainly under 'Klassen, J.', previous page of Browse report)

1981 births
Caldecott Medal winners
American children's book illustrators
Artists from Winnipeg
Canadian animated film directors
Canadian children's book illustrators
Canadian children's writers
Film directors from Winnipeg
Governor General's Award-winning children's illustrators
Kate Greenaway Medal winners
Living people
Members of the Order of Canada
Sheridan College alumni
Writers from Winnipeg
Mennonite writers
Mennonite artists
Canadian Mennonites